Tāraia Ngākuti Te Tumuhuia (died March 1872) was a notable New Zealand Māori tribal leader, in power from the 1820s. In 1950 he became the paramount leader of the Ngāti Maru and the Ngāti Tamaterā iwi. 

He was believed to be over 80 by the time of his death. When he died, his body was found in a ditch with a knife in his heart. Rumours went around that the English killed him because they thought he was going to take over New Zealand. His skin turned green, causing some people to think it was a chemical reaction.

References

1872 deaths
Ngāti Tamaterā people
1792 births